Rita Leistner is a Canadian photographer and filmmaker. She is most noted for her 2021 documentary film Forest for the Trees, for which she was a Canadian Screen Award nominee for Best Cinematography in a Documentary at the 10th Canadian Screen Awards in 2022.

She was active as a photojournalist in the 2000s, most notably covering the Iraq War. Some of her war photography was included in the 2006 book Unembedded: Four Independent Photojournalists on the War in Iraq, alongside photography by Ghaith Abdul-Ahad, Kael Alford and Thorne Anderson.

References

External links

Rita Leistner Official Website
Forest for the Trees Documentary Official Website

Looking for Marshall McLuhan in Afghanistan

21st-century Canadian photographers
21st-century Canadian women artists
Canadian documentary film directors
Canadian women film directors
Canadian cinematographers
Canadian women cinematographers
Canadian photojournalists
Canadian women photographers
War photographers
Living people
Year of birth missing (living people)
Women photojournalists
Canadian women documentary filmmakers